Arif Hikmet Koyunoğlu (1888 - 1982) was a Turkish architect best known for his work on the State Art and Sculpture Museum in Ankara, Turkey.

He died at the age of 94.

Image gallery

External links
https://web.archive.org/web/20070304025009/http://www.archmuseum.org/biyografi.asp?id=26

Turkish architects
1888 births
1982 deaths
First Turkish National architecture